Bishop Abraham Memorial College, Thurithicadu also known as B.A.M College, is a college in Kerala, India, near the town of Mallappally and 14 km south of Thiruvalla. Established in 1965, the college is affiliated to the Mahatma Gandhi University in Kottayam and is recognized by the University Grants Commission (UGC). The college is named after Bishop Abraham Mar Thoma Metropolitan, the saintly soul who dedicated his life for spreading the values of the Kingdom of God.

Principal 

The principal of the college is Dr. Alex Mathew

Programmes Offered

Postgraduate Programmes
M. Com. ( Finance & Taxation)
M. A. Economics
M. Sc. Pure Chemistry
M. Sc. Botany (S/F)

Graduate Programmes
B. A. Economics
B. A. History
B. Sc. Botany
B. Sc. Chemistry
B. Sc. Mathematics
B. Sc. Physics
B. Com. (Finance and Taxation)
B. Com. (Computer Application) - S/F

References

Colleges in Kerala
Colleges affiliated to Mahatma Gandhi University, Kerala
Universities and colleges in Pathanamthitta district
Educational institutions established in 1965
1965 establishments in Kerala
List of colleges affiliated with Mahatma Gandhi University, Kerala#Art and Sciences